Warden Hill is a suburb of Luton, about  north of the town centre, and part of the Borough of Luton, in the ceremonial county of Bedfordshire, England. It is roughly bounded by Central Bedfordshire to the north; Enderby Road, the A6 and Weybourne Drive to the south; Birdsfoot Lane, Grasmere Road, Icknield Way, and the A6 to the west; and Warden Hill and Galley Hill to the east.

History
Warden Hill is named after the hill overlooking it. Formerly part of the parish of Streatley, Warden Hill was a small hamlet centred on the junction of Icknield Way and the A6 until the 1960s. Nearby Galley Hill was formerly a place of public execution.

In the 1960s and 1970s, Warden Hill grew to be a small village, until Luton grew around it in the late 1980s and 1990s.

Local area
Warden Hill Infant and Junior schools are in the area, as well as Luton's only Catholic Secondary school, Cardinal Newman. There is also a church and community centre, a golf course and a pub, The Warden Tavern.

Geography

Neighbouring areas of Warden Hill are Bramingham to the west, and Bushmead and Runfold to the south.

Galley Hill and Warden Hill overlook the area; the latter being the higher and wider of the two. The hills are designated a local nature reserve and Site of Special Scientific Interest. There are a number of rare species, including butterflies, moths and flowers. The Icknield Way Path passes through the hills on its  route from Ivinghoe Beacon in Buckinghamshire to Knettishall Heath in Suffolk.

Politics
Warden Hill is split between Bramingham and Icknield wards in Luton, and is represented by Cllr Gilbert Campbell (Conservative) and Cllr John Young (Conservative).

The wards form part of the parliamentary constituency of Luton North and the MP is Sarah Owen (Labour).

Local attractions

Local newspapers
Two weekly newspapers cover Warden Hill, although they are not specific to the area. 

They are the:
 Herald and Post
 Luton News

References

Areas of Luton